Cheuge is a commune in the Côte-d'Or department in eastern France.
The 1971 movie The Widow Couderc was filmed in the region, and featured houses both sides of the lift bridge over the Marne Canal.

Population

See also
Communes of the Côte-d'Or department

References

Communes of Côte-d'Or